William Anderson (August 31, 1905 – June 6, 1961) was a Canadian politician and businessman. He was elected to the House of Commons of Canada as a member of the Progressive Conservative Party representing the riding of Waterloo South in 1957 and re-elected in 1958.

The son of David Anderson, he was educated in Galt. In 1928, Anderson married Jean Elizabeth Wickens. He established Anderson's Tire Service in Galt. He also founded the William Anderson School for Retarded Children. Anderson served on Galt city council from 1938 to 1942 and from 1944 to 1949 and was mayor from 1954 to 1957. He died in office in Ottawa at the age of 55.

Electoral record

References 

1905 births
1961 deaths
Businesspeople from Ontario
Members of the House of Commons of Canada from Ontario
Progressive Conservative Party of Canada MPs
Mayors of places in Ontario